Weather is a weather forecast app developed by Apple Inc., available on iOS since the release of the iPhone and iPhone OS 1 in 2007. It allows users to see the conditions, forecast, temperature, and other related metrics of the device's current location, as well as a number of other cities. A version of Weather is also available for watchOS; however, it is limited in functionality. Weather was made available on more devices across the Apple ecosystem with the releases of iPadOS 16 and macOS Ventura, where weather data from Apple was previously only available as a widget or through Siri. 

Earlier versions of Weather up through the release of iOS 7 sourced the app's forecast data from Yahoo! Weather; in March 2019, Yahoo! shut down the servers distributing data for the Weather app on devices supporting iOS 7 and earlier operating systems. From iOS 8 to iOS 15, The Weather Channel was used as the app's weather data source. Since iOS 16, Apple has used their own internal forecast data.

Following the acquisition of weather app Dark Sky, many features have been rolled into Apple's own Weather app with the release of iOS 15. Support for Dark Sky ceased on January 1, 2023, with users being urged to migrate to the Weather app.

Functionality 
Locations can be added or removed by pressing the list icon in the bottom right corner of the application, which allows the user to type in the city's name, ZIP Code or postal code or airport code. For each city, the app will display the current, highest, and lowest temperatures, a 10-day forecast, UV index, time of sunrise and sunset, current wind direction and speed, rainfall measurements, current humidity, outdoor visibility range, and barometric pressure. In some locations, the app will also display an air quality report and show next-hour precipitation when raining or snowing.

iOS 14 introduced support for severe weather warnings, allowing a user to receive notifications for government-issued severe weather events such as tornadoes, flash flooding, strong winds, and snow storms. With iOS 15, a weather map can be accessed from the bottom left of the application which can display the temperature, air quality, and a multi-day precipitation forecast.

Inability to display 69°
Former Apple developer João Pavão speculated that the app uses whole numbers in Celsius for the temperature data, later converting it to Fahrenheit for the user interface and thus making it impossible for any number that was not the result of the conversion to be displayed.

WeatherKit API 
WeatherKit is an API integration which provides third-party developers with access to the Apple Weather service, replacing the former Dark Sky API. Developers can make a limited number of 500,000 API requests per month for free, with subscription options available to increase the request limit.

References 

IOS
IOS-based software made by Apple Inc.
Apple Inc. software
Graphic software in meteorology
The Weather Channel